HNLMS Zeefakkel was a hydrographic survey vessel built in the Netherlands for the Royal Netherlands Navy. She was specially designed to perform surveys in coastal areas and did this between 1951 and 1972. Later she was turned into a training vessel.

Design and construction
Zeefakkel was built at the shipyard of J. & K. Smit in Kinderdijk. The ship was laid down on 28 November 1949, launched on 21 September 1950 and commissioned into the Royal Netherlands Navy (RNN) on 22 May 1951. The survey vessel got assigned the pennant number A903.

The ship was equipped with two 8 cylinder four-stroke Smit-Man diesel engines that could produce 320 horsepower each, for a total of 640 hp. This allowed Zeefakkel to reach a maximum speed of 12 knots.

For performing surveys the ship was equipped with several systems: it had a echo sounder, radar, ASDIC, Decca and gyrocompass.

Service history
Zeefakkel performed hydrographic surveys till the end of 1972. The ship was afterwards replaced by one of the hydrographic survey vessels of the Buyskes-class. Nonetheless, Zeefakkel did stay in service of the RNN as training vessel.

She was re-engined in 1980. 

Zeefakkel was still in service circa 1999-2000, when Jane's Fighting Ships 1999-2000 wrote that she was being used as a local training ship at Den Helder. She was to be replaced by another ship possibly to be launched in late 1999. Jane's no longer listed the ship as having any armament.

After the new vessel was placed in service Zeefakkel was laid up in reserve until January 2000, when she was handed over to the Dutch Sea Cadet Corps (:nl:Zeekadetkorps). It appears that she remains in service.

Notes

Citations

References

 
 

Survey vessels of the Royal Netherlands Navy
Training ships of the Royal Netherlands Navy
Ships built in the Netherlands
1950 ships